Carol Davis ( Sagal; born ) is an American businesswoman and sports franchise owner. She is part-owner of the Las Vegas Raiders of the National Football League (NFL).  Davis is the widow of longtime Raiders' owner Al Davis, and inherited the team upon her husband's death on October 8, 2011.

Al Davis suggested in 1997 that Carol would succeed him should he no longer be able to run the Raiders franchise. He repeated this in 2006, and when asked in 2007 who would succeed him, Al Davis again confirmed his intention that Carol would take his place, claiming that then general manager Ron Wolf was "very close to Carol."

Personal life
Davis grew up in New York City, and graduated from New York University with a marketing degree. She worked as a buyer, selecting designer clothing for retail stores, before her husband joined the Raiders. Carol and Al Davis married in a Brooklyn synagogue in 1954 after Al's discharge from the U.S. Army; the couple established a first home in Atlantic Beach, near Al Davis's parents.

In late 1979, Davis suffered a serious heart attack which placed her in the hospital and in a coma for three weeks, but later recovered completely.

Davis has one son, Mark (born 1955).  After her husband's death in October 2011, Raiders chief executive Amy Trask said that the team "will remain in the Davis family."  Carol and Mark hold controlling interest in the Raiders. However, Carol mostly leaves the Raiders in the hands of Mark, who took over his father's old post of managing general partner and operating head of the franchise. Davis still attends some games and was present for the groundbreaking of Allegiant Stadium in 2017. On September 21, 2020, Davis lit the Al Davis memorial torch prior to the Raiders first ever game at Allegiant Stadium. In 2021, she presented Tom Flores for induction to the Pro Football Hall of Fame.

References

1930s births
Living people
Oakland Raiders owners
Las Vegas Raiders owners
Jewish American sportspeople
New York University alumni
21st-century American Jews
Women sports owners